Łuby may refer to:
Łuby, Lublin Voivodeship, Poland
Łuby, Pomeranian Voivodeship, Poland